Khai Khurd is a village and one of the 51 Union Councils (administrative subdivisions) of Khushab District in the Punjab Province of Pakistan. It is located at 31°49'0N 72°13'0E.

References

Union councils of Khushab District
Populated places in Khushab District